Lyra is an unincorporated community in Scioto County, in the U.S. state of Ohio.

History
A post office called Lyra was in operation from 1850 until 1937. Besides the post office, Lyra had a church.

References

Unincorporated communities in Scioto County, Ohio
Unincorporated communities in Ohio